Weeksellaceae is a family in the order of Flavobacteriales.

Genera
The family Weeksellaceae comprises the following genera:

 Algoriella Yang et al. 2016
 Apibacter Kwong and Moran 2016
 Bergeyella Vandamme et al. 1994
 Chishuiella Zhang et al. 2014
 Chryseobacterium Vandamme et al. 1994
 Cloacibacterium Allen et al. 2006
 Cruoricaptor Yassin et al. 2013
 Elizabethkingia Kim et al. 2005
 Empedobacter (ex Prévot 1961) Vandamme et al. 1994

 Frigoriflavimonas Menes et al. 2022

 Moheibacter Zhang et al. 2014
 Ornithobacterium Vandamme et al. 1994

 Riemerella Segers et al. 1993

 Spongiimonas Yoon et al. 2014
 Wautersiella Kämpfer et al. 2006
 Weeksella Holmes et al. 1987

Phylogeny
The currently accepted taxonomy is based on the List of Prokaryotic names with Standing in Nomenclature and the phylogeny is based on whole-genome sequences.

Notes

References

Flavobacteria
Bacteria families